Maxwell Render is an unbiased 3D render engine, developed by Next Limit Technologies in Madrid, Spain. This stand-alone software is used in the film, animation, and VFX industry, as well as in architectural and product design visualization. It offers various plug-ins for 3D/CAD and post production applications.

Overview 
Maxwell Render was released to the public as an early alpha in December 2004 (after two years of internal development) utilizing a global illumination (GI) algorithm based on a metropolis light transport variation. Next Limit Technologies released its latest version of Maxwell Render V4.2 in February 2018.

The physically correct rendering engine was originally used as a tool for animation and visual effects. Maxwell Render's trademark Multilight feature, which permits the changing of light intensities and colors in real time, was used in the feature film The Curious Case of Benjamin Button.

General features 

Physically-based advantages
 Accuracy
 Advanced Ray Tracing
 Physical Sky
 Fast scene set-up
 Layer-based materials
 Multilight

Multilight™
FIRE: Fast Interactive Rendering
 Immediate feedback to make adjustments to lighting, materials and camera settings
Materials
Realistic Camera Model
 Real camera parameters: f-Stop, Focal length, Shutter speed, ISO, film size, diaphragm blades
Memory Saving Instances
Accurate 3D Motion Blur
Hair, Grass and Fur
 Compatible with many hair systems: Maya Shave and a Haircut, Maya hair, 3ds Max hair, CINEMA hair, Ornatrix
Volumetrics
Particle Rendering
 Integration with RealFlow software
 Maxwell Sea
 Maxwell Volumetric
 Maxwell Grass
 Maxwell Scatter

Industry standard support
 Alembic
 AxF
 Deep compositing
 Pixar Open SubDiv
 Python scripting
 VDB

Network Rendering
Post Production
 Post production plug-ins
 Channels
 Custom Alphas

Interaction with other software 
Maxwell Render for SketchUp is a simplified version of Maxwell Render, fully integrated into the SketchUp software application. Users can set the camera, lighting and environment, apply SketchUp or Maxwell MXM materials, and render and save image files. It is widely used in product design, architectural and engineering visualization.

Plug-ins 
3D application plug-ins
 SolidWorks
 SoftImage
 MODO
 MAYA
 Houdini
 Rhinoceros
 SketchUp
 LightWave
 Graphisoft ArchiCAD
 Bonzai 3D
 REVIT
 3DS MAX
 CINEMA 4D
 form Z
Postproduction application plug-ins
 Photoshop
 Nuke
 After effects
Third party supported plug-ins
 solidThinking
 blender

Version history

See also 
 Ray tracing
 Indigo Renderer - Another commercial unbiased renderer
 Kerkythea - A free unbiased renderer
 LuxRender - An open source unbiased renderer
 Octane Render - A commercial unbiased GPU-accelerated renderer

References

External links
 Official Website
 Maxwell Render V3
 Next Limit Technologies (Parent Company)
 Official Forum
 Maxwell Render Resources
 Maxwell Render Tutorials
 Maxwell Render on Facebook
 Maxwell Render on Twitter

Rendering systems
3D rendering software for Linux